Cebu, or Sugbu, also called the Cebu Rajanate, was an Indianized raja (monarchical) mandala (polity) on the island of Cebu in the Philippines prior to the arrival of the Spanish conquistadors. It is known in ancient Chinese records as the nation of Sokbu (束務). According to Visayan oral legend, it was founded by Sri Lumay or Rajamuda Lumaya, a minor prince of the Tamil Chola dynasty. He was sent by the maharajah from India to establish a base for expeditionary forces, but he rebelled and established his own independent polity. The capital of the nation was Singhapala (சிங்கப்பூர்) which is Tamil-Sanskrit for "Lion City", the same rootwords with the modern city-state of Singapore.

History

Foundation of the rajahnate 
According to Visayan folklore, Sri Lumay was a half-Tamil and half-Malay Chola king, who settled in the Visayas, and had several sons. One of his sons was Sri Alho, who ruled a land known as Sialo which included the present-day towns of Carcar and Santander in the southern region of Cebu. Sri Ukob ruled a polity known as Nahalin in the north, which included the present-day towns of Consolación, Liloan, Compostela, Danao, Carmen and Bantayan. He died in battle, fighting with the Muslim Moro pirates known as magalos (literally "destroyers of peace") from Mindanao. The islands they were in were collectively known as Pulua Kang Dayang or Kangdaya (literally "[the islands] which belong to Daya").

Sri Lumay was noted for his strict policies in defending against Moro Muslim raiders and slavers from Mindanao. His use of scorched earth tactics to repel invaders gave rise to the name Kang Sri Lumayng Sugbu (literally "that of Sri Lumay's great fire") to the town, which was later shortened to Sugbu ("scorched earth").

Reign of Sri Bantug 
Sri Lumay was succeeded by the youngest of his sons, Sri Bantug, who ruled from a region known as Singhapala, which is now Mabolo of Cebu City. He died of disease. Sri Bantug had a brother called Sri Parang who was originally slated to succeed Sri Bantug. But he was a cripple and could not govern his polity because of his infirmity. Parang handed his throne to Sri Bantug's son and his nephew, Sri Humabon (also spelled Sri Hamabar), who became the rajah of Cebu in his stead.

Reign of Rajah Humabon 
During Rajah Humabon's reign, the region had since become an important trading center where agricultural products were bartered. From Japan, perfume and glass utensils were usually traded for native goods. Ivory products, leather, precious and semi-precious stones and śarkarā (sugar) mostly came from India and Burma traders. The harbors of Sugbu (the modern-day Parián district of Cebu) became known colloquially as sinibuayang hingpit ("the place for trading"), shortened to sibu or sibo ("to trade"), from which the modern Castilian name "Cebú" originates. It was also during Humabon's reign that Lapulapu arrived from Borneo, and was granted by Humabon the region of Mandawili (now Mandaue), including the island known as Opong or Opon (later known as Mactan). First contact with the Spanish also occurred during Humabon's reign, resulting in the death of Ferdinand Magellan.

The phrase Kota Raya Kita was documented by historian Antonio Pigafetta, to be a warning in the Old Malay language, from a merchant to the rajah and was cited to have meant: "Have good care, O king, what you do, for these men are those who have conquered Calicut, Malacca, and all India the Greater. If you give them good reception and treat them well, it will be well for you, but if you treat them ill, so much the worse it will be for you, as they have done at Calicut and at Malacca."
In reality, this phrase is that of Kota Raya kita, an indigenous Malay phrase of merchants under the authority of Rajah Humabon, with a meaning in English of: "our capital city": Kota (fortress), Raya (great, hence Kotaraya (capital city)), kita (we).

Diplomacy with other Southeast Asian Kingdoms

The Rajahnate of Cebu had diplomatic recognition among the other kingdoms of Southeast Asia. When Ferdinand Magellan's expedition landed on the port-kingdom of Cebu; the expedition scribe noted that not long before, an embassy carried by a ship from Siam (Thailand) arrived at the Cebu Rajahnate and paid tribute to Rajah Humabon.

Dependencies of Cebu
Antonio Pigafetta, the expedition scribe, enumerated the towns and dependencies the Rajahnate of Cebu had.

It is notable how the Spanish mispronounced the Tamil "Singhapala" (சிங்கப்பூர்) as "Cingapola".

Battle of Mactan 
The Battle of Mactan was fought on 27 April 1521 between forces of Rajah Humabon which included the Portuguese explorer Ferdinand Magellan hired by Spanish empire and Lapulapu, it ended with the death of Ferdinand Magellan.

Reign of Rajah Tupas and the subsuming by the Spanish
Sri Parang, the limp, also had a young son, Sri Tupas, also known as Rajah Tupas who succeeded Rajah Humabon as king of Cebu. There is linguistic evidence that Cebu tried to preserve its Indian-Malay roots as time wore on since Antonio Pigafetta the scribe of Magellan described Rajah Tupas' father, the brother of Rajah Humabon as a "Bendara" which means "Treasurer" or "Vizier" in Sanskritized Malay and is a shortening of the word "Bendahara" (भाण्डार) which means "Storage house" in Sanskrit. The Hindu polity was dissolved during the reign of Rajah Tupas by the forces of conquistador Miguel López de Legazpi in the battle of Cebu during 1565.

Relations with other rajahnates
The rajahs of Cebu were relatives to the rajahs of Butuan. Thus the Rajahnates of Cebu and Butuan had relations with each other, as evidenced by the fact that Rajah Colambu of Butuan gave guidance to the Magellan expedition to reach Cebu. The rajahs of Butuan were descendants of Rajah Kiling, who according to Researcher Eric Casino, were not Visayan in origin but rather, Indian, because Kiling refers to the people of India. The Sejarah Melayu (Malay Annals) of the nearby country of Malaysia, point to the similarly worded Keling as the immigrant people from India to Southeast Asia. However, Cebu was not at peace with all Rajahnates. The Rajahnate of Maynila, which was a colony of the Brunei Sultanate and would later become the city of Maynila had an arrogant attitude against Cebuanos and Visayans as the rajah of Maynila who had an Islamic name, Rajah Sulayman, ridiculed the Visayans that came and assisted the Miguel de Legaspi expedition (Which also included the Cebuanos) as an easily conquerable people. Fernao Mendes Pinto, among the earlier Portuguese colonists of Southeast Asia, pointed out that there were Muslims and non-Muslims among the inhabitants of the Philippines who fought each other.

Legacy
Indianization, although it was superseded by Hispanization, left markers in the Cebuano language and culture, such as religious practices and common vocabulary words whose origins are from Sanskrit.

Social stratification and caste system
Below the rulers were the Timawa, the feudal warrior class of the ancient Visayan societies of the Philippines who were regarded as higher than the uripon (commoners, serfs, and slaves) but below the tumao (royal nobility) in the social hierarchy. They were roughly similar to the Tagalog maharlika caste.

Hindu-Buddhist artifacts
In 1921, Henry Otley Beyer found a crude Buddhist medallion and a copper statue of a Hindu deity, Ganesha, in ancient sites in Puerto Princesa, Palawan and in Mactan, Cebu. The crudeness of the artifacts indicates they were of local reproduction. The icons were destroyed during World War II. However, black and white photographs of these icons survive.

Modern name usage
There have been proposals to rename the current Central Visayas region, which is dominated by the Cebuano ethnic group, into Sugbu region, the former name of the region prior to Spanish colonization in the 16th century.

See also

 Related to Cebu polity
 Singhapala – the ancient capital of the polity of Cebu.
 Battle of Mactan
 Lapulapu
 Timawa

 Other related
 List of India-related topics in the Philippines
 Hinduism in the Philippines
 History of the Philippines (Before 1521)
 Pintados

Notes

 https://web.archive.org/web/20110721110617/http://www.nhi.gov.ph/downloads/mp0073.pdf

Former countries in Southeast Asia
Former countries in Philippine history
Barangay states
History of the Philippines (900–1565)
History of Cebu
Historical Hindu kingdoms